James Warren York (more commonly known as J. W. York) was a musician, businessman, business owner and musical instrument innovator. York was born November 24, 1839, in Exeter, New Hampshire, and died February 9, 1927, in Los Angeles, California.

York, a cornet player in Grand Rapids, Michigan, theaters, started an instrument repair company in the latter part of the 19th century.  Two partnerships, "Smith and York" in 1883 and "York and Holton" in 1885, were reformed into the "J.W.York and Company" instrument manufacturing company in 1884.  In 1887, to celebrate the birth of his son Charles E. York, the business was renamed "York & Son".  In 1898, the birth of his other son, Frank W. York, prompted him to rename the business "York & Sons".  The business went through other name changes ("J.W. York", "J.W. York and Sons", "J.W. York Band Instrument Co", "J.W. York Instrument Co.") before finally settling on "York Band Instrument Company".

In 1917, York retired from the musical instrument manufacturing business and moved to California. It was here that, in 1927, he died.

External links 
 International Tuba Euphonium Association; ITEA Journal, Volume 31, Number 4, Summer 2004
 WindSong Press Limited; Brief History of York

Musical instrument manufacturing companies of the United States
1839 births
1927 deaths